Canada's national parks are protected areas under the Canada National Parks Act, owned by the Government of Canada and administered for the benefit, education, and enjoyment of the people of Canada and its future generations. National parks are administered by Parks Canada, a Crown agency operating under the jurisdiction of the Ministry of Environment and Climate Change. The goal of the national parks system is to set aside lands representing the country's 39 distinct natural regions described in the National Parks System Plan, primarily to protect the ecological integrity of the land, and secondarily to allow the public to explore, learn about and enjoy Canada's natural spaces.

Canada's first national park was created in 1885 through an Order-in-Council to reserve  over the Cave and Basin Hot Springs to prevent the land from being sold for private development despite claims being made for it. Modelled after the American experience with Yellowstone National Park, the Rocky Mountains Park Act, adopted in 1887, established the Rocky Mountains Park (now Banff National Park). The idea of a national park was popular and led to numerous proposals for the Ministry of the Interior to consider, including additional sites along the Canadian Pacific Railway (e.g. Yoho and Glacier and an expansion of Banff) and the Grand Trunk Pacific Railway (e.g. Jasper). In 1911 the Rocky Mountains Park Act was replaced by the Dominion Forest Reserves and Parks Act which created the world's first National Park Service, the Dominion Parks Branch, to administer national parks in Canada. These early national parks, including those established under the leadership of JB Harkin who was the first commissioner of the Dominion Parks Branch, were set aside to reserve lands principally for tourism and conservation but also had an exclusionary policy prohibiting First Nations peoples from using their traditional lands within the new parks. In 1922, Wood Buffalo National Park was the first to allow traditional indigenous activities to continue. In 1972, Parks Canada defined national park reserves as lands administered by the agency intended to become national parks pending settlement of indigenous land rights and agreements for continued traditional use of the lands.

There is at least one park located in every one of the nation's 13 provinces and territories. Parks Canada reported attendance of 15,449,249 at all national parks and reserves in 2016–17, including over four million visits to the busiest park (Banff) and only two persons at the least-visited park (Tuktut Nogait). Parks Canada additionally manages three National Marine Conservation Areas (NMCAs), a single NMCA Reserve, and the country's lone National Landmark. The Canada National Parks Act also allows for recognition of National Historic Sites that commemorate events, landmarks, or objects of national importance, and which may include similar levels of protection and administration as national parks. Feasibility studies are underway to establish further national parks in unrepresented regions.

National parks and national park reserves

National park reserves are indicated by "(Reserve)" after the park name. The national urban park is indicated by "(Urban)" after the park name.

By province/territory

Proposed National Park Reserves
The following are areas which Parks Canada is in the process of evaluating as potential parks. While they may be reserved from alienation or have federal-provincial/territorial agreements, they have not been formally established through legislation as parks.

There remain six Natural Regions unrepresented by either current or proposed parks. As Parks Canada has a long-term goal of preserving representative areas of all Natural Regions, future parks will likely be established in these areas. These regions are:
 the "Boreal Lake Plateau" region of Newfoundland and Labrador and Quebec
 the "Laurentian Boreal Highlands" region of Newfoundland and Labrador and Quebec
 the "Northern Interior Plateaux and Mountains" region of British Columbia and Yukon
 the "Southampton Plain" region of Nunavut
 the "Ungava Tundra Plateau" region of Quebec and Nunavut
 the "Whale River" region of Newfoundland and Labrador, Nunavut, and Quebec

Abolished national parks

 Brereton and Vidal were transferred to provincial jurisdiction, both continuing as (renamed) provincial parks.
 Buffalo, Menissawok, Nemiskam and Wawaskesy were created expressly to protect and regenerate dangerously low populations of bison and pronghorn, and were delisted when those populations improved.

National Marine Conservation Areas
National Marine Conservation Areas (NMCAs) is a program established in 2002 with the goal of preserving marine ecosystems representing the 29 marine regions of Canada. They are designed for sustainable use, although they usually also contain areas designed to protect ecological integrity. National Marine Conservation Area Reserves are protected areas proposed to be added to the NMCA system pending settlement of indigenous land and water rights. In the interim, they are administered under park rules.

, established NMCAs and NMCA Reserves protect  of waters, wetlands, and coastlines, representing five of the 29 identified marine regions with studies underway for protected areas in three additional regions.

Proposed National Marine Conservation Areas

National Landmarks
The National Landmarks program was established in 1978 to protect specific natural features considered "outstanding, exceptional, unique, or rare to this country. These natural features would typically be isolated entities and of scientific interest." The enabling legislation expired 10 years later, and was not renewed. Pingo National Landmark was the only such unit established in that time.

Provincial parks categorized as national parks

Provincial and territorial parks are administered and funded by their respective governments. However, Quebec has named its provincial parks “national parks”, though none are in the national park system. 

Some sub-national parks are categorized by the IUCN under the umbrella term national parks (Category II) in its global Protected Area Management Categories. As of 2011, there were more than 1500 Category II-listed areas across the country, including nearly 700 in B.C., and at least 500 in Ontario. Only Quebec uses the term “national park” for such provincial areas, using the IUCN’s category name as justification.  

In addition to the national park system, several federal agencies manage natural, scientific, and recreational areas. In the National Capital Region, a number of parklands come under the jurisdiction of the National Capital Commission, including Gatineau Park in Quebec. None of these are part of the national park system.

See also
 List of Canadian protected areas
 List of UNESCO Biosphere Reserves in Canada
 List of national historic sites of Canada
 List of World Heritage Sites in Canada

Notes

References

External links

National Parks of Canada
National Marine Conservation Areas of Canada
World Heritage Sites in Canada
The Canada Guide

 
Canada
Lists of protected areas of Canada